Pteria hirundo is a species of bivalve belonging to the family Pteriidae.

The species is found in Europe, Africa and the Americas.

<div align=center>
Right and left valve of the same specimen:

</div align=center>

References

Pteriidae
Taxa named by Carl Linnaeus
Molluscs described in 1758